Adad-apla-iddina, typically inscribed in cuneiform mdIM-DUMU.UŠ-SUM-na,  mdIM-A-SUM-na or dIM-ap-lam-i-din-[nam] meaning the storm god “Adad has given me an heir”, was the 8th king of the 2nd Dynasty of Isin and the 4th Dynasty of Babylon and ruled  1064–1043. He was a contemporary of the Assyrian King Aššur-bêl-kala and his reign was a golden age for scholarship.

Biography

Provenance

The broken obelisk of Aššur-bêl-kala relates that the Assyrians raided Babylonia, early in his reign:

Depending on the exact synchronization of the Assyrian and Babylonian chronologies, this would have been shortly before, or at the very beginning of Adad-apla-iddina’s reign.

His ancestor Esagil-Šaduni is named in the Synchronistic History as his “father”, but he was actually ”a son of a nobody,” i.e. without a royal parent. This chronicle recounts that he was appointed by the Assyrian king Aššur-bêl-kala, who took his daughter for a wife and “took her with a vast dowry to Assyria,” suggesting Babylon had become a vassal of Assyria. He names Nin-Duginna as his father in one of his own inscriptions, but this is indicative of divine provenance. Adad-apla-iddina who was “son” of Itti-Marduk-balaṭu, recorded in the Chronicle 24: 8 and also duplicated in the Walker Chronicle possibly meaning a descendant of the early 2nd Dynasty of Isin king, by a collateral line, or speculatively the aforementioned father of Kadašman-Buriaš.

His reign was apparently marked by an invasion of Arameans led by a usurper. “Der, Dur-Anki (Nippur). Sippar, Parsa (Dur-Kurigalzu) they demolished. The Suteans attacked and the booty of Sumer and Akkad they took home.” These attacks were confirmed in an inscription of a later king of the following dynasty, Simbar-šihu, which relates

The Epic of the plague-god Erra, a politico-religious composition from the time of Nabu-apla-iddina,  886-853 BC, which endeavors to provide a theological explanation for the resurgence of Babylonia following years of paralysis, begins its tale of distress with the reign of Adad-apla-iddina. The god Erra, whose name means “scorched (earth),” is accompanied by Išum, "fire," and  disease-causing demons called Sibitti.

Period scholarship

His reign was celebrated in the first millennium BCE as a golden age for scholarship and he appears twice in the Uruk List of Sages and Scholars alongside Šaggil-kīnam-ubbib and Esagil-kin-apli.

The Babylonian Theodicy was attributed to the scholar Šaggil-kīnam-ubbib and believed to have been composed during his reign according to a later literary catalogue. It is a dialogue where the protagonist bemoans the state of contemporary social justice and his friend reconciles this with theology. Originally with 27 stanzas each of 11 lines, an acrostic has been restored which reads, “I, Šaggil-kīnam-ubbib, the incantation priest, am adorant of the god and the king.” It is extant in multiple copies from the Library of Ashurbanipal in Nineveh, Assur, Babylon, and Sippur. His career was believed to have spanned the reigns of Nabū-kudurri-uṣur to Adad-apla-iddina, or five reigns if the latter king’s name can be restored in context.

Esagil-kin-apli, the ummânu (chief scholar) and a “prominent citizen” of Borsippa, gathered together the many extant tablets of diagnostic omens and produced the edition that became the received text of the first millennium.  In the introduction he warned, “Do not neglect your knowledge! He who does not attain(?) knowledge must not speak aloud the SA.GIG omens, nor must he pronounce out loud Alamdimmû SA.GIG (concerns) all diseases and all (forms of) distress.” Referred to as SA.GIG, the omen series continued on a series of 40 tablets grouped under six chapters. He may also have been responsible for editing other physiognomic omen works including the Alamdimmû, Nigdimdimmû, Kataduggû, Šumma Sinništu, and Šumma Liptu.

There is also a late copy of an astrological text originally dated to his eleventh year.

Contemporary evidence

He rebuilt extensively, including the Imgur-Enlil, city wall of Babylon, which had collapsed from old age according to a cylinder inscription, and the Nīmit-Marduk, rampart of the wall of Nippur, commemorated on a cone. He made a votive offering of an engraved gold belt to the statue of Nabû at the E-zida temple at Borsippa. The ramp leading up to the temple of Nin-ezena in Isin bears his inscriptions recording his repairs. In Larsa, he repaired the Ebabbar temple and in Kiš he reconstructed the Emete’ursag for Zababa. Stamped bricks witness his construction efforts in Babylon and to the great Nanna courtyard and in the pavement against the northeast face of the ziggurat at Ur.

There are seven extant economic texts ranging in date from his fifth to his nineteenth year. A stone tablet records a legal transaction and is dated to his first year. A fragment of a kudurru records his gift of an estate to Mušallimu and another records a deed of land to Marduk-akhu-[ ... .].

He may well have connived to replace Aššur-bêl-kala’s son and successor, Eriba-Adad II, with his uncle, Šamši-Adad IV, who had been in exile in Babylonia.

Inscriptions

Notes

References

11th-century BC Babylonian kings
11th-century BC rulers
Kings of the Universe